Kurdish coffee or menengiç coffee, meaning pistachio coffee or terebinth coffee, is a traditional hot beverage in Kurdish and Turkish cuisine. It is made of ground roasted terebinth fruits (related to the pistachio) as the main ingredient, and is caffeine-free. It is particularly popular in parts of southeastern Anatolia.

History 

The beverage has been produced in areas including Diyarbakır, Adıyaman, Mardin, and Batman for over a hundred years. The roasted and ground berries have been exported to Europe and around the world since the early 20th century.
It is also considered a traditional specialty of Gaziantep.

In recent years, the processed berries in the form of an oily paste have appeared as a branded product in cans or jars.

References

Kurdish cuisine
Hot drinks
Coffee drinks
Turkish drinks